La Bazouge-de-Chemeré is a commune in the Mayenne department in northwestern France.

Geography

The village stands on a promontory above the Vaige river. On the opposite side there are limestone quarries and old lime kilns.

The village stands at the far east of the Armorican Massif so the geology presents various facies : limestone, coal, rhyolite, slate, slate shale. Luckily there were anthracite mines dedicated to the lime kiln. The lime was used for liming (soil) until 1896 when chemical fertilizers have been available, so the lime kilns has stopped and also the mining because coal layers are not regular but spread in distant columns.

History
In 1926 the lightning torched the bell tower then the church. The steeple cover has been built again shorter and the bells were cast again then baptized in 1930. But the fire has brought up covered frescoes of the 16th century showing the dictation of the three dead and the three alive (three skeletons tell three young men the life is short...)

Economy
After being an industrial town in the 19th century with lime kilns, quarries and mining, La Bazouge-de-Chemeré returns mainly to agriculture in 20th century.
Tourism starts 40 years ago with bed and breakfast and rural lodging in cottages.
Nowadays a well-known Ultralight aviation aerodrome stands at the old mine.

La Bazouge-de-Chemeré through artists
Some painters passed in the village :
 Felix Desille has painted a watercolor of the 'Hôtel du Porche'(Porch hotel) in 1914 and already wished its restoration.
 Giuseppe Tribus an Italian painter who had fled fascism in Italy and had taken refuge in the village has immortalized the roaring flyover of German bombers on 17 June 1940.
 Édouard Cortès, from a photography and by his invention, has depicted the church street, once 'a snowy evening' and once 'sunshine after rain' (circa 1945) as he used to paint Paris streets.
In 1950 Tribus has painted the porch of the hotel (demolished in 1960) and the church steeple.

 Sold painting  : Edouard Cortes - La Bazouge-de-Chemere, a snowy evening (circa 1945) 
 Sold painting : Edouard Cortes - La Bazouge-de-Chemere, sunshine after rain (circa 1945) strangely named 'south of France'

Population

Gallery

See also
Communes of Mayenne

References

Communes of Mayenne